Folinella ghisottii is a species of sea snail, a marine gastropod mollusk in the family Pyramidellidae, the pyrams and their allies.

Distribution
This marine species occurs in the following locations:
 European waters (ERMS scope)
 Greek Exclusive Economic Zone
 Portuguese Exclusive Economic Zone
 Spanish Exclusive Economic Zone

References

 van Aartsen J. J. (1984). The Pyramidellid genera described by the marquis L. de Folin. Bollettino Malacologico 20 (5-8): 131-138

External links
 To CLEMAM
 To Encyclopedia of Life
 To World Register of Marine Species

Pyramidellidae
Gastropods described in 1984